Barsukovo is a rural locality (a village) in Tregubovskoye Rural Settlement, Velikoustyugsky District, Vologda Oblast, Russia. The population was 33 as of 2002.

Geography 
Barsukovo is located 11 km south of Veliky Ustyug (the district's administrative centre) by road. Pestovo is the nearest rural locality.

References 

Rural localities in Velikoustyugsky District